Hong-Cai (Joe) Zhou (born c. 1964) is a Chinese-American chemist and academic. He is the Davidson Professor of Science and Robert A. Welch Chair in Chemistry at Texas A&M University. He is the associate editor of the journal Inorganic Chemistry.

Early life and education
Zhou gained admission to Beijing Normal University at the age of 16, and took up a position as a lecturer there after receiving his bachelor's degree, teaching introductory chemical engineering classes. In 1996, at the age of 32, he stepped down from his position and chose to go abroad to pursue further studies. Zhou earned a Ph.D. in chemistry at Texas A&M University in 2000, studying under F. Albert Cotton. He was a postdoctoral fellow at Harvard University working with Richard H. Holm.

Career
In 2002, he joined the faculty at Miami University. He won a National Science Foundation CAREER Award in 2005 and received tenure in 2007. In 2008, Zhou moved to Texas A&M University. In 2014, he was promoted to Davidson Professor of Science and a joint holder of the Davidson Chair in Science. He holds a Welch Chair in Chemistry.

Professional work
Zhou's research group focuses on metal-organic frameworks (MOFs) with over 350 publications in peer-reviewed journals, including more than 150 in high impact journals such as Nature Chemistry, Nature Communications, Journal of the American Chemical Society, and Angewandte Chemie. Since 2008, the number of citations of his work has increased exponentially reaching annual citations of over 8,643 in 2020 and total citations of around 57,171 with an h-index of 105. Since 2013, he serves as an associate editor of the ACS journal Inorganic Chemistry.

Zhou has invented a toolkit for the manipulation of self-assembly of porous materials from a coordination hollow cage to a predesigned, extended network full of hierarchical cavities, bearing various functional groups on the internal surface. These porous structures with hierarchical porosity and programmed sequence of functional groups are in urgent demand for the creation of ordered architectures that can channel the mass and energy flow, which are critical for catalysis, energy harvesting/storage, as well as information processing.

Zhou is a trail blazer in synthetic inorganic chemistry of "Pore Engineering", a term coined by Zhou. His research focuses on the design, preparation, and application of framework materials such as hollow coordination cages, metal-organic frameworks (MOFs), and porous polymer networks. He is best known for introducing a variety of tools to control the structure, porosity, and functionality of framework materials. Some of his seminal contributions include "bridging-ligand substitution", "ligand-fragment co-assembly",  "kinetic analysis and tuning", "linker installation", "linker labilization", "cluster and linker metalation", "linker migration", "domino lattice rearrangement", and "retrosynthetic design". These contributions formed the aforementioned "toolkit" for MOF synthesis, which enables the preparation and functionalization of MOFs for a wide range of applications, especially in gas storage, separation, catalysis, biomedicine, and degradation of recalcitrant pollutants. Recently, he expanded this MOF toolkit into modular design of hierarchically porous MOFs, MOF hybrids, MOF superstructures, and MOF-polymer composites, which formed the basis of "Pore Engineering".

The essence of "Pore Engineering" is by controlling the assembly procedure of frameworks, taking advantage of the tunable lability of coordination and dynamic covalent bonds, to make functionalized hierarchical structures from microporous to mesoporous level and beyond.

In the MOF research community, Zhou became one of the international leaders. He served as a guest editor (co-editors: Jeffrey Long and Omar Yaghi) for the first Chem. Rev. thematic issue on Metal-Organic Frameworks in 2012. This important volume in MOF research served as a catalyst for the maturation of the MOF field. He has co-edited a themed issue for Chem. Soc. Rev. (coeditor: Susumu Kitagawa) in 2014. In 2008, he co-organized (organizer: Wenbin Lin) an ACS Symposium: Metal-Organic Frameworks: What Are They Good for? In 2013, he organized (co-organizer: Wenbin Lin) another ACS Symposium, Metal-Organic Frameworks: Where Do We Stand? These two symposia brought in record-number of attendees and stimulated new research ideas and activities in MOF community. In 2016, he gave a webinar on MOFs for Gas Storage, which was organized by the Editorial Board of Chem. In 2018, he co-organized (Organizer: Shengqian Ma; co-organizer: Wenbin Lin) the third ACS MOF Symposium, Metal-Organic Frameworks: What Are Next?

Honors and awards
His awards include a Research Innovation Award from Research Corporation in 2003, an NSF CAREER Award in 2005, a Cottrell Scholar Award from Research Corporation in 2005, the 2006 Miami University Distinguished Scholar-Young Investigator Award, the 2007 Faculty Excellence Award from Air Products, as well as the 2010 DOE Hydrogen Program Special Recognition Award as a main contributor to the Hydrogen Sorption Center of Excellence. In 2014, he received a JSPS Invitation Fellowship. In 2017, he was awarded the Association of Former Students of Texas A&M University Distinguished Achievement Award in Research. Since 2014, he has been listed annually as a "Highly Cited Researcher" by Clarivate Analytics (formerly Thomson Reuters).  He was elected a fellow of the AAAS, ACS, and RSC, respectively.

References

1960s births
Living people
21st-century American chemists
Beijing Normal University alumni
Texas A&M University alumni
Miami University alumni
Texas A&M University faculty
Place of birth missing (living people)